Wansbeck General Hospital is a district general hospital based in Ashington, Northumberland, England. It is managed by Northumbria Healthcare NHS Foundation Trust.

History
The first phase of the hospital, which was designed for low energy consumption, secured a "Green Building of the Year Award" after it was completed in June 1993. The second phase, which followed the transfer of services from the old Ashington Hospital, was procured under a Private Finance Initiative contract in 2000. The new facility was designed by Reiach and Hall Architects and built by M J Gleeson at a cost of £18 million; it was officially opened by Alan Milburn, Secretary of State for Health in 2003.

A new simulation-based training centre was opened by the Duchess of Northumberland in November 2016 and a new oncology day unit was opened in July 2017.

The hospital has a walk-in urgent care centre, 12 wards and various outpatient clinics.

See also
List of hospitals in England
Northumberland Hospital Radio

References

External links
Official site

Hospital buildings completed in 1993
NHS hospitals in England
Hospitals in Northumberland
Ashington